The 1922–23 WCHL season was the second season for the Western Canada Hockey League. Four teams played 30 games each.

Regular season

Final standings
Note: W = Wins, L = Losses, T = Ties, GF= Goals For, GA = Goals Against, Pts = Points

Scoring leaders

Stanley Cup Finals

The Edmonton Eskimos won the WCHL championship and advanced directly to the Stanley Cup Finals, where they would face the National Hockey League champion Ottawa Senators. Ottawa had previously defeated the Pacific Coast Hockey Association champions, the Vancouver Maroons. Ottawa then defeated Edmonton two games to none in the best-of-three series to win the Stanley Cup.

See also
List of Stanley Cup champions
Pacific Coast Hockey Association
List of NHL seasons
1922 in sports
1923 in sports

References
HockeyDB

Western Canada Hockey League seasons
WCHL